The Jazz We Heard Last Summer is a split album featuring saxophonist Sahib Shihab and flautist Herbie Mann's groups recorded in 1957 for the Savoy label.

Reception

Allmusic awarded the album 3 stars stating "Generally speaking, the Shihab tracks are a bit meatier, causing the momentum to taper off toward the end of the disc. This should not, however, sway fans of late-'50s bop, as a number of the scene's top players are featured on this admittedly short set".

Track listing
Side One:
 "S.M.T.W.T.F.S.S. Blues" (Sahib Shihab) - 6:36
 "Rockaway" (John Jenkins) - 6:43
 "The Things We Did Last Summer" (Jule Styne, Sammy Cahn) - 7:03
Side Two:
 "Green Stamp Monsta" (Herbie Mann) - 7:58
 "World Wide Boots" (Phil Woods) - 8:22

Personnel

Side One
John Jenkins - alto saxophone - lead melody track 3
Clifford Jordan - tenor saxophone
Sahib Shihab - baritone saxophone
Hank Jones - piano
Addison Farmer - bass
Dannie Richmond - drums

Side Two
Herbie Mann - flute, tenor saxophone
Phil Woods - alto saxophone
Eddie Costa - piano, vibraphone
Joe Puma - guitar
Wilbur Ware - bass
Jerry Segal - drums

References 

1957 albums
Sahib Shihab albums
Herbie Mann albums
Albums produced by Ozzie Cadena
Albums recorded at Van Gelder Studio
Savoy Records albums